Hibiscus aethiopicus is a small, prostrate to semi-erect herbaceous perennial in the family Malvaceae, indigenous to eastern and southern Africa.  

The flowers can be pale yellow to white (rarely pinkish), usually without a dark centre. The epicalyx has 10 to 12 narrow fringed bracts. The leaves are hairy and elliptic-to-oval in shape.

References

Renosterveld
aethiopicus